This is a list of the largest law firms in Japan by number of lawyers, including both Japanese and foreign-qualified lawyers, as of November 27, 2013, compiled by Babelstaff K.K.

See also
List of largest law firms by revenue
List of largest United States-based law firms by head count
List of largest United States-based law firms by profits per partner
List of largest United Kingdom-based law firms by revenue
List of largest Canada-based law firms by revenue
List of largest Europe-based law firms by revenue
List of largest China-based law firms by revenue

References

Japanese
Law firms

Japan-based law firms